Veikkola is a village in Kirkkonummi municipality in Uusimaa, Finland. The regional road 110 also passes through the village. Veikkola has almost 6,000 inhabitants. Near Veikkola is the Nuuksio National Park.

There are two elementary schools in Veikkola, of which Veikkola School (Veikkolan koulu) is a 1–9 grade comprehensive school and Vuorenmäki School (Vuorenmäen koulu) is a 1–6 grade elementary school. Veikkola School was founded in 1899, and the current school building was built in 2004. Veikkola also has a health center, a library, several kindergartens and a nursing home, and a sports park with a soccer field. Veikkola also has three grocery stores: S Group's S-Market and Kesko's K-Market and K-Supermarket, and one R-kioski convenience store.

See also 
 Evitskog
 Nummela (Vihti)
 Ojakkala

References

External links 

 Ajankohtaista Veikkolassa – Veikkolaverkko (in Finnish)

Kirkkonummi
Villages in Finland